Dr. Richard Austin Freeman  (11 April 1862 – 28 September 1943) was a British writer of detective stories, mostly featuring the medico-legal forensic investigator Dr. Thorndyke. He invented the inverted detective story (a crime fiction in which the commission of the crime is described at the beginning, usually including the identity of the perpetrator, with the story then describing the detective's attempt to solve the mystery). This invention has been described as Freeman's most noticeable contribution to detective fiction. Freeman used some of his early experiences as a colonial surgeon in his novels. Many of the Dr. Thorndyke stories involve genuine, but sometimes arcane, points of scientific knowledge, from areas such as tropical medicine, metallurgy and toxicology.

Early life
Austin Freeman was the youngest of the five children of tailor Richard Freeman and Ann Maria Dunn. At the age of 18 he entered the medical school of the Middlesex Hospital and qualified  in 1886.

After qualifying, Freeman spent a year as a house physician at the hospital. He married his childhood sweetheart Annie Elizabeth Edwards in London on 15 April 1887, and the couple later had two sons. He then entered the Colonial Service in 1887 as an assistant surgeon. He served for a time in Keta, Ghana, in 1887 during which time he dealt with an epidemic of black water fever which killed forty percent of the European population at that port. He had six months of leave from mid 1888 and returned to Accra on the Gold Coast just in time to volunteer for the post of medical officer on the planned expedition to Ashanti and Jaman.

Freeman was the doctor, naturalist and surveyor for the expedition to Ashanti and Jaman, two independent states in the Gold Coast. The expedition set out from Accra on 8 December 1888, with a band consisting of a band-master and six boys playing two side drums and five fifes, three European officers (the Commissioner, Freeman and the Officer in Charge of the Constables), one Native officer, 100 Hausa constables, a gunners' party with a rocket trough, an apothecary, apothecary's assistant, a hospital orderly, and 200 bearers. The expedition went first to Kumasi (or Coolmassie as it appears in older accounts), the capital of the then independent kingdom of Ashanti. Their second port of call was Bondoukou, Ivory Coast, where they arrived only to find that the king had just signed a protectorate treaty with the French.

However, the expedition was a political failure as the British spokesman blurted out in front of the chiefs that the British were willing to supply a loan of £400 which the king had requested. However the King had requested this loan with the proviso that it be kept secret from his chiefs. He therefore denied any knowledge of it and the expedition moved on to Bontúku, the capital of Jaman. Here they were left cooling their heels while the King there finalised a treaty with the French, who had been quicker off the mark. The expedition was recalled after five months. Bleiler asserts, without any supporting evidence, that "It was mostly through Freeman's intelligence and tact that the expedition was not massacred". Although the mission overall was a failure, the collection of data by Freeman was a success, and his future in the colonial service seemed assured. Unfortunately, he became ill with blackwater fever and was invalided home in 1891, being discharged from the service two months before the minimum qualification period for a pension.

Career
Thus, he returned to London in 1891, and in c. 1892 served as temporary Acting Surgeon in Charge of the Throat and Ear Department at Middlesex Hospital. He was in general practice in London for about five years. He was appointed acting Deputy Medical Officer of Holloway Prison in c. 1901, and Acting Assistant Medical Officer of the Port of London in 1904. A year later he suffered a complete breakdown in his health and gave up medicine for authorship. 
 
His first successful stories were the Romney Pringle rogue stories written in collaboration with John James Pitcairn (1860–1936), medical officer at Holloway Prison. Some were published first in Australia, under the joint pen name of Ralph J. Jay, and all of them were serialised under another pseudonym, "Clifford Ashdown" in Cassell's Magazine in 1902 and 1903.

In 1905 Freeman published his first solo novel, The Golden Pool, with the background drawn from his own time in West Africa. The protagonist is a young Englishman who steals a fetish treasure. Barzun and Taylor make the point that while this is a crime, the book was not regarded as crime fiction as "according to old notions" stealing things from Africans "is no crime". Bleiler wrote that "it is a colorful, thrilling story, all the more unusual in being ethnographically accurate" and that "it used to be required reading for members of the British colonial services in Africa."

Freeman's first Thorndyke story, The Red Thumb Mark, was published in 1907, and shortly afterwards he pioneered the inverted detective story, in which the identity of the criminal is shown from the beginning. Some short stories with this feature were collected in The Singing Bone in 1912. During the First World War, he served as an induction physician and a captain in the Royal Army Medical Corps and afterwards produced a Thorndyke novel almost every year until his death in 1943.

Later life
Freeman briefly stopped writing at the outbreak of the Second World War, but then resumed writing in an air-raid shelter he had built in his garden. Freeman was plagued by Parkinson's disease in his later years. This makes his achievement all the more remarkable, as in his declining years he wrote both Mr. Polton Explains, which Bleiler says "... is in some ways his best novel", and The Jacob Street Mystery (1942) in which Roberts considers that Thorndyke "is at his analytical best." He was living at 94, Windmill Street, Gravesend, Kent when he died on 28 September 1943. His estate was valued at £6,471 5s 11d. Freeman was buried in the old Gravesend and Milton Cemetery at Gravesend. The Thorndyke File  started a funding drive to erect a granite marker for Freeman's grave, and this was erected in September 1979, with the text: Richard Austin Freeman, 18621943, Physician and Author, Erected by the friends of "Dr. Thorndyke", 1979.

Political views

Freeman held conservative political views. In his 1921 book Social Decay and Regeneration Freeman put forth the view that mechanization had flooded Britain with poor-quality goods and created a "homogenized, restless, unionized working class". Freeman supported the eugenics movement and argued that people with "undesirable" biological traits should be prevented from breeding through "segregation, marriage restriction, and sterilization". The book also attacked the British Labour movement and criticised the British government for permitting immigrants (whom Freeman referred to as "Sub-Man") to settle in Britain. Social Decay and Regeneration referred to the Russian Revolution as "the Russian catastrophe" and argued that society needed to protected from "degenerates of the destructive or" Bolshevik "type". Sections of Social Decay and Regeneration were reprinted in Eugenics Review, the journal of the British Eugenics Society.

Anti-Semitism
Freeman's views on Jewish people were complex stereotypes. They are clearly set out in his eugenicist book Social Decay and Regeneration (1921). Here Freeman states that of vulgarity "the only ancient peoples who exhibited it on an appreciable scale were the Jews and especially the Phoenician." Freeman notes that a large proportion of the "Alien Unfit" crowding the East End of London, "largely natives of Eastern Europe" are Jews. However, the criticism is of the poor rather than of Jews overall as these unfit aliens were "far from being the elect of their respective races". Freeman regards that, through restricting marriage with non-Jews, Jews as having practised racial segregation "for thousands of years with the greatest success and with very evident benefit to the race". Not surprisingly, some of these views spill over into his fiction.

Grost states that Helen Vardon's Confession (1922) "is another bad Freeman novel suffering from offensive racial stereotypes". Helen Vardon is blackmailed into marrying the fat, old, money-lender Otway, who was "distinctly Semitic in appearance", and is surrounded by Jews, to save her father from prison. Otway acts in bad faith, and is grasping, keeping only one servant despite his great wealth. The whole plot is a gratuitously offensive anti-Semitic stereotype. Grost also states that the use of racial stereotypes in The D'Arblay Mystery (1926) "marks it as a low point in Freeman's fiction". However, the villain is not Jewish at all, and the only question of stereotypes comes up in the questions about whether the villain's (false) hooked nose is "a curved Jewish type, or a squarer Roman nose?" There are no anti-Semitic tropes in the book, no grasping money-lender etc. Grost describes Pontifex, Son and Thorndyke (1931), as degenerating into "another of Freeman's anti-Semitic diatribes". In this novel the villains are largely Jewish, and come from the community of "unfit aliens" that Freeman lambastes in Social Decay and Regeneration.

Such offensive representations of Jews in fiction were typical of the time. Rubinstein and Jolles note that while the work of many of the leading detective story writers, such as Agatha Christie, Dorothy L. Sayers, and Freeman, featured many gratuitously negative depictions of stereotyped Jewish characters, this ended with the rise of Hitler, and they then portrayed Jews and Jewish refugees in a sympathetic light. Thus with Freeman, the later novels no longer present such gratuitously offensive racial stereotypes, but present Jews much more positively.

In When Rogues Fall Out (1932) Mr. Toke describes the Jewish cabinetmaker Levy as "A most excellent workman and a thoroughly honest man", high praise from Freeman's pen. The counsel for Dolby the burglar, "a good-looking Jew named Lyon" executes a particularly brilliant defence of his client which Thorndyke admires. In Felo de Se; or Death at the Inn (1937) the croupier is described as "a pleasant-faced Jew, calm, impassive and courteous, though obviously very much 'on the spot'". In The Stoneware Monkey (1938), Thorndyke is using a young Jewish man as his messenger. In Mr Polton Explains (1938), Polton is assisted first by the Jewish watchmaker Abraham and then by the Jewish solicitor Cohen, who comes to Polton's aid not once but twice, not only representing him without cost, but feeding him and lending him money without interest or term.

Critical assessment
Freeman was a significant author of detective fiction in his day. He was most famous for his creation of Dr. Thorndyke, and many of the obituaries recording his death referred to this in the headlines. Thus the Birmingham Daily Gazette announced "'Dr. Thorndyke' Creator Dead", the Belfast News-Letter announced "Obituary Dr. R. A. Freeman, Creator of 'Dr. Thorndyke'", and the Evening Star (Dunedin) announced "Obituary: Creator of Dr. Thorndyke".

Critical comment has tended to concentrate on four aspects of Thorndyke: Freeman's quality as a writer; the close attention to logic, scientific accuracy and methods in his stories; the invention of the inverted detective story, and comparisons with Sherlock Holmes. The Times considered that the second and third of these were what singled Freeman "out from the ruck".

Writing
In Bloody Murder, Julian Symons wrote that Freeman's "... talents as a writer were negligible. Reading a Freeman story is very much like chewing dry straw." Symons then went on to criticise the way in which Thorndyke spoke. De Blacam also noted Thorndyke's "ponderous legal phraseology". However, that pedantic ponderousness is the nature of Thorndyke's character. He is a barrister and used to weighing his words carefully. He never discusses his analysis until he has built the whole picture. Others do not agree with his assessment of Freeman's writing skills. Raymond Chandler, in a 13 December 1949 letter to Hamish Hamilton said: "This man Austin Freeman is a wonderful performer. He has no equal in his genre and he is also a much better writer than you might think, if you were superficially inclined, because in spite of the immense leisure of his writing he accomplishes an even suspense which is quite unexpected."

Binyon also rates Freeman's writing as inferior to Doyle saying "Thorndyke might be the superior detective, Conan Doyle is undeniably the better writer." The Birmingham Daily Post considered that "Mr. Austin Freeman was not, perhaps, among the finer artists of the short story, and his longer stories could limp, sometimes" but that his approach was very effective.

However, de Blacam makes the point that, quite apart from the description of the investigation, each of the descriptions of the crimes in the inverted stories "was a fine piece of descriptive writing". Grost agrees that "Freeman's descriptive writing is excellent"  Adey finds that: "Freeman's writing, though lacking Doyle's atmospheric touch, was clear and concise, with dry humor and a keen eye for deductive detail." Adams agreed that Freeman had considerable powers of narrative description when he stated that "Nothing but the author's remarkable skill in character delineation and graphic narrative" could save his stories from being regarded as technical studies for a course on forensic medicine.

The proof of the pudding is in the eating, and Bleiler noted in 1973 that Freeman "... is one of the very few Edwardian detective story writers who are still read".

The inverted story
Nowadays, the inverted detective story, where we first witness the crime and then watch the attempt to solve it, is commonplace. For example, this is the format of almost every episode of the television detective series Columbo starring Peter Falk. However, this approach was an innovation in November 1910 when Freeman's "Oscar Brodski" appeared in Pearson's Magazine. and immediately attracted attention. The Northern Whig said that "Oscar Brodski" was "one of the most powerful detective stories we have ever read". Bleiler said that this story "has always been considered one of the landmarks in the history of the detective story". 

In his essay The Art of the Detective Story Freeman wrote that in the inverted story: "The reader had seen the crime committed, knew all about the criminal, and was in possession of all the facts. It would have seemed that there was nothing left to tell, but I calculated that the reader would be so occupied with the crime that he would overlook the evidence. And so it turned out. The second part, which described the investigation of the crime, had to most readers the effect of new matter." However, Binyon notes that Freeman is being too modest here, and that it was Freeman's art that kept the reader's attention in the second part.
  
Reviewers approved of Freeman's inverted tales. The Scotsman said that Freeman had "... proved that a tale which tells the story of the crime first, leaving us to follow the sleuth as he tracks the criminal down, may be at least as absorbing as the old yarns which left us in the dark until the end". Rodgers noted that "Great narrative skill is needed in order to keep the reader's interest" in a story where the crime if revealed at that start and that there have been imitators "Freeman alone stands as not only the originator, but as the most successful proponent of this form of detective fiction".

Precision of logic, facts, and method
Freeman paid a great deal of attention to details, and carried out the experiments described in his books to ensure that they worked and would give the expected results. He also went to the trouble of visiting the places he wrote about so that the details in his descriptions were correct. De Balcam says that "Freeman displays a mastery of craftsmanship" in every story, and that he always used the language of the trade concerned. Freeman is "a man who writes of things that he has seen, handled and understood, and not of things that he has met only in print, or in a hazy, inattentive observation". This is a critical aspect of Freeman - he tested the methods he used. The top floor of his house was a workshop and laboratory, and his books sometimes included drawings or micrographs illustrating the evidence.

One instance that shows that the methods and approaches described by Freeman were practicable lies in the prosecution of an apprentice from Barrow for coining. The apprentice had followed a method described in one of the Danby Croker stories by Freeman, and had produced a number of sovereigns that he had successfully passed.

The Birmingham Post noted that his attention to forensic science was fuller and "certainly more systematically than any other writer of detective stories" and that the accuracy of his stories gained him  "an exceptionally large proportion of readers of the more exacting and less easily satisfied type".

On logic Adams stated that to read Freemans cases intelligently "... implies a definite exercise in the use of 'Mill's Canons of Inductive Logic'" and the books offered a very practical means of testing students' understanding of the canons. Herbert notes that Thorndyke's reasoning "... is distinguished by its rigorous logic". Thorndyke, like his creator, was a medical man, he was also a barrister, and "combined his legal and medical training into a personage of willful dominance, impeccable logic, and scholarly and comprehensive inductive reasoning".

Comparisons with Sherlock Holmes
Inevitably, commentators compared Thorndyke with Holmes. Binyon says that Thorndyke stands out from the other late Victorian and early Edwardian detectives in being a rival to Sherlock Holmes, rather than just owing their existence to his success. "Thorndyke is the most impressive and the most intellectually powerful of fictional detectives." Poupard notes that "In critical comparisons with Holmes, Dr. Thorndyke is deemed the more accurate thinker and ranked superior as a scientific authority, whereas Holmes is considered the superior literary creation". One immediate clue to the difference between Thorndyke and Holmes, is that Holmes calls his inductive reasoning deduction, a mistake that Thorndyke would never make. Binyon notes that Holmes often makes factual errors, referring to the blue carbuncle as crystallised charcoal, when it contains no carbon, and referring to non-existent species or martial arts.

Ward compares how Holmes deals with a hat as a clue in Doyle's short story The Adventure of the Blue Carbuncle (1892) with how Thorndyke treats a similar clue in Freeman's short story The Anthropologist at Large (1909). After examining the hat, Holmes declares that:
The man is intellectualas he has a large head size.
That he was once well to do, but is no longeras the hat was an expensive style from three years ago that is now shabby.
That he was a man of foresight, but has suffered moral retrogression, probably due to drinkas the hat has had a safety guard fitted to it, but the owner has failed to renew the elastic.
That he is middle-aged, has grizzled hair which had recently been cut and that he used lime creamfrom an examination of the lining 
That his wife has ceased to love himas the hat has not been brushed for weeks (there is other evidence that he is married).
That he probably does not have town-gas in his houseas there are several tallow stains, presumably from guttering candles, on the hat.

For his part, the first observation that Thorndyke makes is that hats often change owners over their lives, so one needs to interpret the evidence with caution. This immediately explodes at least the second and third of Holmes's conclusions. Thorndyke then induces that:
The man is Japanesefrom the shape of the head, as the had has clearly been steamed to fit a particular head, and from a hair sample, which matches Japanese rather than European or African hair.
That he works at a mother of pearl factorydue to the large amount of pearl shell dust inside the hat. At the time, this business was largely carried out by Japanese and Chinese immigrants.
That he is a decent orderly manas there is no accumulation of dust on the outside of his hat.
Ward notes that Thorndyke's conclusions are sound, less capricious, and more practical, and allow Thorndyke to track his man down, whereas Holmes has to advertise to find his.

Herbert notes that in comparison to Holmes, "Thorndyke has no eccentricities, and his reasoning, unlike that of his contemporary, is distinguished by its rigorous logic – considered purely as a detective, he is perhaps the most impressive of all fictional sleuths".

Bibliography

Longer works by Freeman including collaborations

The following list is based on:
The entries for Freeman, and the pseudonym, Clifford Ashdown, for his collaboration with John James Pitcairn in the Jisc Library Hub Discover catalogue. 
The list of Freeman titles in Make Mine a Mystery by G. W. Neibuhr
The list of Freeman and Ashdown titles in A Catalogue of Crime by Barzun and Taylor.
 The list provided in the Dictionary of Literary Biography by John McAleer.
The list in the Crime Fiction 1749-1980: A Bibliography, by Hubin.

Detailed content of short-story collections
John Thorndyke's Cases (1909) (published in the United States as Dr. Thorndyke's Cases)
 The Man with the Nailed Shoes
 The Stranger's Latchkey
 The Anthropologist at Large
 The Blue Sequin
 The Moabite Cipher
 The Mandarin's Pearl
 The Aluminum Dagger
 A Message from the Deep Sea

The Singing Bone (1912) (published in the United States as The Adventures of Dr. Thorndyke)
 The Case of Oscar Brodski (an inverted short story)
Part I. The Mechanism of Crime
Part II. The Mechanism of Detection
 A Case of Premeditation (an inverted short story)
Part I. The Elimination of Mr. Pratt
Part II. Rival Sleuth-Hounds
 The Echo of a Mutiny (an inverted short story)
Part I. Death on the Girdler
Part II. "The Singing Bone"
 A Wastrel's Romance (an inverted short story)
Part I. The Spinster's Guest
Part II. Munera Pulveris
 The Old Lag
Part I. The Changed Immutable
Part II. The Ship of the Desert

The Great Portrait Mystery and other Stories (1918)
 The Great Portrait Mystery (not a Thorndyke story)
 The Bronze Parrot (not a Thorndyke story)
 The Missing Mortgagee (an inverted Thorndyke short story)
 Powder Blue and Hawthorne (not a Thorndyke story)
 Percival Bland's Proxy (an inverted Thorndyke short story)
 The Attorney's Conscience (not a Thorndyke story)
 The Luck of Barnabas Mudge (not a Thorndyke story)

Dr. Thorndyke's Casebook (1923) (published in the United States as The Blue Scarab)
 The Case of the White Footprints
 The Blue Scarab
 The New Jersey Sphinx
 The Touchstone
 A Fisher of Men
 The Stolen Ingots
 The Funeral Pyre
The Puzzle Lock (1925)
 The Puzzle Lock
 The Green Check Jacket
 The Seal of Nebuchadnezzar
 Phyllis Annesley's Peril
 A Sower of Pestilence
 Rex v. Burnaby
 A Mystery of the Sand-hills
 The Apparition of Burling Court
 The Mysterious Visitor

The Magic Casket (1927)
 The Magic Casket
 The Contents of a Mare's Nest
 The Stalking Horse
 The Naturalist at Law
 Mr. Ponting's Alibi
 Pandora's Box
 The Trail of Behemoth
 The Pathologist to the Rescue
 Gleanings from the Wreckage

 The Famous Cases of Dr. Thorndyke (London: Hodder & Stoughton, 1929 and later reprintings) -- an omnibus of previously published stories
 The Case of Oscar Brodski (an inverted short story)
Part I. The Mechanism of Crime
Part II. The Mechanism of Detection
 A Case of Premeditation (an inverted short story)
Part I. The Elimination of Mr. Pratt
Part II. Rival Sleuth-Hounds
 The Echo of a Mutiny (an inverted short story)
Part I. Death on the Girdler
Part II. "The Singing Bone"
 A Wastrel's Romance (an inverted short story)
Part I. The Spinster's Guest
Part II. Munera Pulveris
 The Missing Mortgagee (an inverted Thorndyke short story)
 Percival Bland's Proxy (an inverted Thorndyke short story)
 The Old Lag
Part I. The Changed Immutable
Part II. The Ship of the Desert
 Stranger's Latchkey
 The Anthropologist at Large
 The Blue Sequin
 The Moabite Cipher
 The Aluminum Dagger
 The Magic Casket
 The Contents of a Mare's Nest
 The Stalking Horse
 The Naturalist at Law
 Mr. Ponting's Alibi
 Pandora's Box
 The Trail of Behemoth
 The Pathologist to the Rescue
 Gleanings from the Wreckage
 The Puzzle Lock
 The Green Check Jacket
 The Seal of Nebuchadnezzar
 Phyllis Annesley's Peril
 A Sower of Pestilence
 Rex v. Burnaby
 A Mystery of the Sand-hills
 The Apparition of Burling Court
 The Mysterious Visitor
 The Case of the White Footprints
 The Blue Scarab
 The New Jersey Sphinx
 The Touchstone
 A Fisher of Men
 The Stolen Ingots
 The Funeral Pyre
The American edition of this is R. Austin Freeman, The Dr. Thorndyke Omnibus: 38 of His Criminal Investigations as set down by R. Austin Freeman (New York: Dodd, Mead, 1932 and later reprintings). The American edition includes one story, "The Mandarin's Pearl," printed in the first Thorndyke short-story collection, John Thorndyke's Cases, but omitted from the British omnibus. Two other stories, though also appearing in the first Dr. Thorndyke short-story collection, John Thorndyke's Cases, were omitted from the British and American editions of the omnibus collection: "The Man with the Nailed Shoes" and "A Message from the Deep Sea."

The Best Dr. Thorndyke Detective Stories (1973), edited by E.F. Bleiler.
 The Case of Oscar Broski (an inverted short story)
Part I. The Mechanism of Crime
Part II. The Mechanism of Detection
 A Case of Premeditation (an inverted short story)
Part I. The Elimination of Mr. Pratt
Part II. Rival Sleuth-Hounds
 The Echo of a Mutiny (an inverted short story)
Part I. Death on the Girdler
Part II. "The Singing Bone"
 The Mandarin's Pearl
 The Blue Sequin
 The Moabite Cipher
 The Aluminum Dagger
 31 New Inn (believed to have been written about 1905 and later expanded to novel length), which was also published in volume I of the Freeman omnibus, published by Battered Silicon Dispatch Box

 The Dead Hand and Other Uncollected Stories, edited by Douglas G. Greene and Tony Medawar (Shelburne, Ontario: The Battered Silicon Dispatch Box, 1999). 
 The Dead Hand. (This story was believed to have been written in 1912 and later expanded to novel length as The Shadow of the Wolf; the short story was also published in Detection by Gaslight, 14 Victorian detective stories, an anthology by Douglas G. Greene (Dover. 1997).
 The Sign of the Ram
 The Mystery of Hoo Marsh
 The Mystery of the Seven Banana Skins
 Caveat Emptor: The Story of a Pram
 Victims of Circumstance
 The Great Tobacco "Plant"
 Beyond the Dreams of Avarice
 A Bird of Passage: A Story of the Thames
 The Sleuth-Hounds
 The Free Trip
 The Comedy of the Artemis
 The Resurrection of Matthew Jephson
 A Signal Success
 The Ebb Tide
 By the Black Deep
 A Question of Salvage
 Under the Clock
 The Costume Model
 Ye Olde Spotted Dogge
 A Suburban Autolycus
 A Woman's Vengeance
 Ruth
 The Great Slump
 The Art of the Detective Story
 The Cleverest Murder - In Fact or Fiction
 The Peasenhall Mystery
 Meet Dr Thorndyke

Short stories written with John James Pitcairn
 "The Assyrian Rejuvenator". Australian Town & Country Journal, 13 and 20 July 1901, as by "Ralph J Jay". Reprinted Cassell's Magazine, June 1902, as by "Clifford Ashdown". Collected in The Adventures of Romney Pringle.
 "The Foreign Office Despatch". Australian Town & Country Journal, 20 and 27 July 1901, as by "Ralph J Jay". Reprinted Cassell's Magazine, July 1902, as by "Clifford Ashdown". Collected in The Adventures of Romney Pringle
 "The Chicago Heiress". Australian Town & Country Journal, 27 July and 3 August 1901, as by "Ralph J Jay". Reprinted Cassell's Magazine, August 1902, as by "Clifford Ashdown". Collected in The Adventures of Romney Pringle
 "The Lizard's Scale". Australian Town & Country Journal, 10 August 1901, as by "Ralph J Jay". Reprinted Cassell's Magazine, September 1902, as by "Clifford Ashdown". Collected in The Adventures of Romney Pringle
 "The Paste Diamonds". Australian Town & Country Journal, 17 August 1901, as by "Ralph J Jay". Reprinted Cassell's Magazine, October 1902, as by "Clifford Ashdown". Collected in The Adventures of Romney Pringle
 "The Kailyard Novel". Australian Town & Country Journal, 24 August 1901, as by "Ralph J Jay". Reprinted Cassell's Magazine, November 1902, as by "Clifford Ashdown". Collected in The Adventures of Romney Pringle
 "The Submarine Boat". Cassell's Magazine, June 1903, as by "Clifford Ashdown". Collected in The Further Adventures of Romney Pringle
 "The Kimberley Fugitive". Cassell's Magazine, July 1903, as by "Clifford Ashdown". Collected in The Further Adventures of Romney Pringle
 "The Silk Worms of Florence". Cassell's Magazine, August 1903, as by "Clifford Ashdown". Collected in The Further Adventures of Romney Pringle
 "The Box of Specie". Cassell's Magazine, September 1903, as by "Clifford Ashdown". Collected in The Further Adventures of Romney Pringle
 "The Silver Ingots". Cassell's Magazine, October 1903, as by "Clifford Ashdown". Collected in The Further Adventures of Romney Pringle
 "The House of Detention". Cassell's Magazine, November 1903, as by "Clifford Ashdown". Collected in The Further Adventures of Romney Pringle
 "The Adventure at Heath Crest". Cassell's Magazine, December 1904, as by "Clifford Ashdown". Collected in From a Surgeon's Diary
 "How I Acted for an Invalid Doctor". Cassell's Magazine, January 1905, as by "Clifford Ashdown". Collected in From a Surgeon's Diary
 "How I Attended a Nervous Patient". Cassell's Magazine, February 1905, as by "Clifford Ashdown". Collected in From a Surgeon's Diary
 "How I Met a Very Ignorant Practitioner". Cassell's Magazine, March 1905, as by "Clifford Ashdown". Collected in From a Surgeon's Diary
 "How I Cured a Hopeless Paralytic". Cassell's Magazine, April 1905, as by "Clifford Ashdown". Collected in From a Surgeon's Diary
 "How I Helped to Lay a Ghost". Cassell's Magazine, May 1905, as by "Clifford Ashdown". Collected in From a Surgeon's Diary

Uncollected short stories
The short stories from Cassell's Family Magazine are from the index of fiction prepared for the Victorian Fiction Research Unit, Department of English, University of Queensland by Sue Thomas."
 The Mutiny on the Speedwell. Novel Magazine, May 1914 (Jack Osmond). See also A Certain Dr Thorndyke
 The Gun Runner. Novel Magazine, June 1914 (Jack Osmond). See also A Certain Dr Thorndyke

Non-fiction
 The Interior of the Gold Coast. Macmillan's Magazine, June 1899
 In the London Docks. Living London, January 1902
 Hospital London. Living London, June 1902. Reprinted Living London, December 1902
 Afflicted London. Living London, September 1902. Reprinted Living London, October 1905
 The Coastwise Lights of England. Cassell's Magazine, November 1902
 London below Bridge. Living London, December 1902. Reprinted Living London, January 1906
 The Royal Yacht. Cassell's Magazine, April 1903
 A Thames Sailing Barge Match. Cassell's Magazine, September 1903
 Small Yacht Racing. Cassell's Magazine, May 1904
 The Sentinels of the Port of London. Cassell's Magazine, October 1905
 Down the River. Cassell's Magazine, January 1906
 The Tightening Grip. Straits Times, 5 November 1917
 The Art of the Detective Story. The Nineteenth Century and After, May 1924
 The Pendulum. Todmorden Advertiser and Hebden Bridge Newsletter, 23 March 1928
 Hot Boiled Beans. Newark Advertiser, 7 November 1928
 An Englishman's Rights. Nottingham Evening Post, 28 February 1929 
 The Two Aspects of Liberty. Hartlepool Northern Daily Mail, 10 April 1933
 Democracy to Dictatorship. Hartlepool Northern Daily Mail, 3 March 1934 (Freeman's original title was "From Democracy to Dictatorship")
 Liberty and Property. Nottingham Evening Post, 29 November 1934
 The Return of the Autocrat - Orders in Council. Linlithgow Gazette, 3 April 1936
 What Has become of Democracy?. Mid-Sussex Times, 28 April 1936
 Liberty and Intelligence. Portsmouth Evening News, 16 October 1936
 Does Dullness Create Dictatorship?. Hartlepool Northern Daily Mail, 17 October 1936
 Preservation of Liberty. Portsmouth Evening News, 18 June 1937
 Liberty and Reciprocity. Linlithgowshire Gazette, 18 June 1937
 On Being a Good Neighbour. Kirkintilloch Herald, 23 June 1937
 Liberty and Physique. Hartlepool Northern Daily Mail, 29 January 1938
 Enemies of Liberty. West London Observer, 2 December 1938
 War is Destructive of Liberty. Sunderland Daily Echo & Shipping Gazette, 14 July 1939
Liberty and Peace. West London Observer, 21 July 1939
 Individualism and War. Falkirk Herald, 18 October 1939
 War Sacrifices for a Purpose. Grimsby Daily Telegraph, 23 November 1939
 Hard Cases and Bad Law. Hartlepool Northern Daily Mail, 4 April 1940
 Liberties Surrendered for Future Freedom. Portsmouth Evening News, 12 September 1940 [Also published as Hitlerism 'On Appro.''', Freeman's original title, Motherwell Times, 13 September 1940]
 Freedom of the Citizen. Hartlepool Northern Daily Mail, 13 September 1940
 Good Breeding - The Importance of Eugenics. Thanet Advertiser, 25 April 1941
 Eugenics and Liberty. Falkirk Herald, 23 April 1941; also published as ‘'Good Breeding; The Importance of Eugenics'’. Thanet Adviser, 25 April 1941
 What of the Future?. Falkirk Herald, 29 October 1941
 The Passing of Personal Liberty. Hartlepool Northern Daily Mail, 24 April 1942; also published as The Passing of Personal Liberty towards the Human Ant-Hill. West London Observer, 1 May 1942. (Freeman's original title was The Passing of Freedom)
 Liberty and Equality. Falkirk Herald, 9 September 1942
 Medical Profession: Dangers of State Service. 25 November 1942. Also published as Medical Profession and Socialization of the Medical Profession (Freeman's original title)
 The Doppelganger. Publication unknown 
 The Economics of Liberty. Publication unknown 
 The Militant's Strategy. Publication unknown 
 Is Fingerprint Evidence Fallible?. Publication unknown 
 His Majesty's Savings. Publication unknown 
 The Renegades. Publication unknown
 The Three Wishes. Publication unknown 
 The Unauthorised Raiders. Publication unknown

Unconfirmed stories
[The records of Freeman's agent, A P Watt, identify the following items as having been published but do not provide any further details]

 The Adventures of Jack Osmond Publication unknown. See also A Certain Dr Thorndyke The Auchtermuchtie Burglary Publication unknown 
 The Automatic Boat Publication unknown 
 La Belle Anglaise Publication unknown 
 The Cavern Publication unknown 
 A Corpse in the Case Publication unknown 
 A Crusader's Misadventures Publication unknown
 The Haarschneide Machine Publication unknown
 Mr Pordle's Homecoming Publication unknown

Adaptations

Television adaptations
A short series featuring Dr Thorndyke was produced by the BBC in 1964, entitled Thorndyke. The title character was played by veteran British actor Peter Copley.

Based on the stories written by R Austin Freeman, the episodes, all of which except the pilot are missing from the BBC archive, were as follows:
The Case of Oscar Brodski (Pilot – as part of BBC series "Detective')
The Old Lag
A Case of Premeditation
The Mysterious Visitor
The Case of Phyllis Annesley
Percival Bland's Brother
The Puzzle Lock

Three stories were also adapted as part of the Thames TV series The Rivals of Sherlock Holmes in 1971–3. These were:
A Message From The Deep Sea (from the 1st series and starring John Neville as Thorndyke)
The Assyrian Rejuvenator (1st series, starring Donald Sinden as Romney Pringle)
The Moabite Cipher (2nd series, starring Barrie Ingham as Thorndyke)

Both series are available on DVD – in the UK from Network Video and in the United States from Acornmedia.

Radio adaptation
Starting in 2011 the BBC aired radio adaptations of some of the Thorndyke short stories, Thorndyke: Forensic Investigator on BBC Radio 4 Extra.

Series 1
November 2011 read by Jim Norton
 A Mysterious Visitor
 The Puzzle Lock
 A Mystery of the Sand Hills
 Pathologist to the Rescue
 The Secret of the Urn
 Pandora's Box

Series 2
March 2013 read by William Gaminara
 The Stolen Ingots
 Rex v Burnaby
 The Stalking Horse

In popular culture

Literature
 In Donna Andrews's Owl's Well That Ends Well, a near-mint first-edition copy of The Uttermost Farthing provides the motive for the murder.

Biographies and studies
 R. Austin Freeman: The Anthropologist at Large, Oliver Mayo, Hawthornedene, South Australia: Investigator Press, (1980). This biography, in addition to reviewing Freeman's fiction gives special attention to the African and sociological works. It was reprinted in Volume 11 of the Freeman Edition by Battered Silicon Dispatch Box in 1998.
 In Search of Doctor Thorndyke, Norman Donaldson (Bowling Green, Ohio, 1971). A second expanded edition was published in 1998 as Volume 10 of the Battered Silicon Dispatch Box edition of Freeman.
 The Thorndyke File was started by Philip T. Asdell of Maryland in Spring 1976, and published articles of scholarship on Freeman twice a year. John McAleer took over in 1980 and the journal ran on until 1988. Half of the subscribers were medical doctors.
 John Thorndyke's Journal was published in England from 1991 to 1998 by David Ian Chapman of Aldershot, Hampshire. 
 Collecting R. Austin Freeman'', David Ian Chapman (Highfield Press, Aldershot, 2022) Revised Second Edition.

Notes

References

External links

 
 
 
 
 Works by R. Austin Freeman at Project Gutenberg Australia
 94 Windmill Street, Gravesend on Google Street View.

1862 births
1943 deaths
20th-century British writers
British Army personnel of World War I
English crime fiction writers
English mystery writers
Members of the Detection Club
Royal Army Medical Corps officers
British male novelists
People with Parkinson's disease
British detective fiction writers
British anti-communists